Sir George Fleming, 2nd Baronet (1667 – 2 July 1747) was a British churchman.

A member of the old Westmorland family, Fleming was the fifth son of Sir Daniel Le Fleming of Rydal Hall. Along with his three brothers, he was educated at Sedbergh School. From Sedbergh, he progressed to St Edmund Hall, Oxford in 1688. He became Canon of Carlisle Cathedral in 1700, Archdeacon of Carlisle in 1705, Dean in 1727 and finally Bishop of Carlisle in 1734. He succeeded as 2nd baronet in 1736. A successor, the Revd Sir Richard Le Fleming Bt, became rector of both Windermere and Grasmere and gave William Wordsworth a home at Rydal Mount.

Before moving to Rydal Hall, the Le Fleming family lived at Coniston Hall, which is now owned by the National Trust.

External links 
 St Martin, Windermere
 Rydal Hall
 Rydal Mount
 Le Fleming of Rydal Hall, by Ann Galbraith

1667 births
1747 deaths
Baronets in the Baronetage of England
Bishops of Carlisle
Deans of Carlisle
Archdeacons of Carlisle
People educated at Sedbergh School
18th-century Church of England bishops
People from Coniston, Cumbria